Legislative elections were held in São Tomé and Príncipe on 1 August 2010. The elections had been planned for 21 February, but were then postponed. President Fradique de Menezes announced on 17 March 2010 that elections would be held on 1 August 2010.

Results
The opposition Independent Democratic Action emerged as the largest party, winning 26 of the 55 seats. Prime Minister Joaquim Rafael Branco's MLSTP-PSD came second with 21 seats. Third was PCD, a member of the ruling coalition, with seven seats. President de Menezes's MDFM-PL won only one seat.

References

Elections in São Tomé and Príncipe
Sao Tome
2010 in São Tomé and Príncipe
February 2010 events in Africa